The European Air Materiel Command was a support organization of the United States Army Air Forces.

History
After November 1942, the Ninth Air Force was established in Egypt to replace the U.S. Army Middle East Air Force. Major General Lewis H. Brereton assumed command, and established the IX Air Service Command, which joined the IX Bomber Command and the IX Fighter Command as the major subordinate headquarters. IX Air Service Command was changed to IX Air Force Service Command (IX AFSC) by an unnumbered Ninth Air Force Memorandum of 29 January 1944.

IX Air Force Service Command was more clearly patterned after its Eighth Air Force opposite number than any of the other Ninth Air Force commands. A number of officers and enlisted men had been brought to England from Egypt, but most of the key members of the headquarters came from the Eighth Air Force. General Miller, for most of the past year the commander of the VIII AFSC, took over the IX AFSC in October 1943 and brought with him members of his former staff. From the Tactical Air Depot Area came additional officers and men to round out a headquarters staff rich in experience. On 5 May, Brig. Gen. Myron R. Wood succeeded General Miller as commander of the IX AFSC. In mid-November, the service command headquarters moved into newly constructed quarters across from the Ascot race course, adjacent to the Ninth Air Force headquarters at Sunninghill Park.

The projected size of the Ninth Air Force and the scope of its operations clearly required a large and mobile service command. The service command, in turn, recognized early that its own size and wide-flung operations made decentralization of its organization desirable. Accordingly, borrowing from the experience of VIII AFSC, in October it set up a base air depot area (BADA) and an advanced air depot area (AADA) which were areas in terms of function rather than geography. The base air depot area was intended primarily for supply and aircraft assembly functions. For a time, BADA was located at Constitution Hill, Sudbury, in Suffolk. In December the IX AFSC divided the advanced air depot area into a 1st and 2d AADA. This further decentralization of the command was purportedly in preparation for the move to the continent, where mobile warfare would require decentralized operations. In addition, the two headquarters could be, and were, of value in organizing and training the many service units formed in the United Kingdom by the IX AFSC.

Beginning in August 1943, RAF Grove was used by the 3rd Tactical Air Depot of IX Air Service Command, repairing A-20 Havocs and P-61 Black Widows.  Starting on 31 October, the 31st Transport Group, IX Air Service Command used the airfield with C-47 Skytrains with the mission of transporting cargo and personnel between IX Air Force airfields in the UK.  The 31st TG consisted of the 87th, 313th and 314th Transport Squadrons.

In 1945 IX Air Force Service Command was reassigned from Ninth Air Force to USSTAF (about the date IX ASC moved to Erlangen). On 7 October 1946, IX AFSC was redesignated European Air Materiel Command. This command administered United States Air Forces in Europe's supply and maintenance depots. EAMC was headquartered at Erlangen Air Depot. At Erding Air Depot, it had  Detachment B, 4th Air Vehicle Repair Squadron, and the 43d Air Depot. The 10th Air Depot was located at Oberpfaffenhofen Air Depot. The 862d Engineer Aviation Battalion and 837th Engineer Aviation Battalion were located at Landsberg. At Industriehafen Air Depot was Detachment A, 42d Air Repair Squadron. Minor EAMC facilities were located at Bad Wiesse, Wolfgang, Munich, Bruck, Oberwiesenfeld and Bremerhaven.  EAMC also controlled ammunition depots at Landesberg, Roth and Zepplenheim. EAMC remained assigned to USAFE until it was inactivated on 15 September 1947.

Lineage
 Constituted as the 9th Air Force Service Command on 27 July 1942
 Redesignated IX Air Force Service Command on 18 September 1942
 Redesignated IX Air Service Command in 1943
 Redesignated IX Air Force Service Command on 24 January 1944
 Redesignated European Air Materiel Command on 7 October 1946
 Inactivated on 15 September 1947
 Disbanded on 8 October 1948

Assignments
 3d Air Force (later Third Air Force), 27 Jul 42
 Air Service Command, September 42
 Ninth Air Force, November 1942
 Twelfth Air Force, August 1943
 Ninth Air Force, September 1943
 United States Strategic Air Forces (later United States Air Forces Europe), c. 2 December 1945

Components
 Commands
 Tactical Air Depot Area (later I Tactical Air Depot Area), c. October 1943 – unknown
 1st Advanced Air Depot Area Command, c. 16 December 1943 – 1945
 2d Advanced Air Depot Area Command, c. 16 December 1943 – 1945
 VIII Tactical Air Service Area Command (later Ninth Air Force Advanced Depot Area Command), 16 October 1943 – c. 28 January 1944

 Division
 Air Disarmament Division, 10 January 1945 – 1 March 1946

 Depot Areas
 Continental Air Depot Area (Provisional) [later Central Air Depot Area (Provisional)], 10 December 1944 – c. 30 April 1945
 IX Air Force Base Air Depot Area, 12 November 1943 – c. 5 June 1945

 Depots

 Erding Air Depot, 5 November 1946 – 15 September 1947
 European Air Depot, September 1945 – 5 November 1946
 Montdidier Air Ammunition Depot, 15 June 1946 – 20 September 1946
 2d Depot Unit, Army, c. April 1945 – 15 September 1947
 Ninth Air Force Base Depot, 5 June 1945 – September 1945
 10th Air Depot Group (later 10th Air Depot), 30 December 1945 – 15 September 1947
 42d Air Depot Group (later 42d Air Depot), 31 December 1945 – 5 June 1947
 44th Air Depot, c. 1 June 1946 – 15 December 1946
 45th Air Depot, c. 1 January 1946 – c. 31 August 1947

 Regiments
 1585th Quartermaster Truck Regiment
 1586th Quartermaster Truck Regiment

 Wings
 302d Transport Wing, 5 December 1943 – 1 September 1944

 Groups
 31st Transport Group, 28 October 1943 – c. 1 September 1944
 323d Bombardment Group, Medium, 15 Jun – 25 Nov 1945

Stations

 MacDill Field, Florida, 27 July 1942
 Patterson Field, Ohio, 1 September 1942
 Tinker Field, Oklahoma, 9 October 1942
 Camp Kilmer, New Jersey, 29 October 1942 – 1 November 1943
 Camp Russell B. Huckstep, Heliopolis, Egypt, November 1942
 Cairo, Egypt, 12 November 1942
 Welford Park (Station 474), England, 10 October 1943
 RAF Bushy Park (Station 586), England, 16 October 1943
 RAF Grove, England (Station 519), c. October 1943
 Sunninghill Park (Station 472), 7 November 1943
 Creil (A-81), France, 20 September 1944
 Luxembourg, Luxembourg, c. 30 April 1945
 Erlangen Air Base, 15 August 1945 – 15 September 1947

Campaigns

Notes

References 
 
 
 
 
 
 AF Pamphlet 900-2, Unit Decorations, Awards and Campaign Participation Credits, Department of the Air Force, Washington, DC, 15 June 1971

Intermediate service commands of the United States Army Air Forces
Military units and formations established in 1946
Military units and formations disestablished in 1947